Aureibaculum marinum is a Gram-negative, aerobic and non-motile bacterium from the genus of Aureibaculum which has been isolated from marine sediments from the Bohai Gulf.

References 

Flavobacteria
Bacteria described in 2021